Mark Ovenden is the sportscaster for KDLT-TV in Sioux Falls, South Dakota.

Ovenden started his sportscasting career at WTVR-TV in Richmond, Virginia in 1976.  Since that time, Ovenden has served as sportscaster for KSFY-TV and KELO-TV in Sioux Falls, South Dakota before assuming his current post at KDLT-TV.

External links
Mark Ovenden's biography at the KDLT website.

Living people
Year of birth missing (living people)
South Dakota television reporters
Sportspeople from Sioux Falls, South Dakota
Journalists from South Dakota